Sacramento Pride is an American women's soccer team, founded in 2001. The team is a member of the Women's Premier Soccer League, the third tier of women's soccer in the United States and Canada. The team plays in the North Division of the Pacific Conference.

The team's colors are yellow and royal blue.

The team was formerly known as Elk Grove Pride and Elk Grove United.

Notable former players
 Stephanie Cox 
 Megan Rapinoe

Year-by-year

Stadium
 Stadium at Elk Grove High School; Elk Grove, California -present

External links
Official Site
WPSL Sacramento Pride page

   

Women's Premier Soccer League teams
Women's soccer clubs in California
P
Roseville, California
2001 establishments in California
Association football clubs established in 2001